Vittorio Sardelli (10 June 1918 – 7 October 2000) was an Italian footballer who played as a defender. On 26 November 1939, he represented the Italy national football team on the occasion of a friendly match against Germany in a 5–2 away loss.

References

1918 births
2000 deaths
Italian footballers
Italy international footballers
Association football defenders
Genoa C.F.C. players